Hannu Rainer Järvenpää (born May 19, 1963 in Ii, Finland) is a Finnish ice hockey coach and a retired professional ice hockey player. He is the current Head Coach of HC Gherdëina, an Italian team playing in the Alps Hockey League.

Järvenpää played 114 games for the Winnipeg Jets of the NHL and is a member of the Finnish ice hockey Hall of Fame.

Playing career 
Järvenpää played for Kärpät in Finland's top-flight Liiga in the early- and mid-1980s. From 1986 to 1989, he played 114 games for the Winnipeg Jets in the National Hockey League (NHL). He then returned to Finland and joined Lukko in 1989, where he spent two years. The 1991–92 season saw him skate for Leksands IF in Sweden. After wearing Jokerit colours in 1992–93, he moved to fellow Liiga team Espoo Blues, where he spent the last two years of his playing career.

Järvenpää represented Finland's national team on several occasions, including the 1992 Olympic Games and the World Championships in 1985, 1986, 1989, 1991 and 1992 (silver medal).

Coaching career 
He served as assistant coach of Liiga team SaiPa from 2003 to 2005 followed by a one-year stint with fellow Liiga outfit Lahti Pelicans in the same position.

Järvenpää took over head coaching duties at HDD Olimpija Ljubljana, a Slovenian member of the Austrian Hockey League (EBEL), in 2009 and remained in that job until 2012. He then served as head coach of fellow EBEL team EV VSV from 2012 to November 2015, when he was sacked. In early January 2016, he was named head coach of Alba Volán Székesfehérvár and parted ways with the EBEL team at the end of the 2015–16 season.

In May 2016, he was named head coach of Lausitzer Füchse of the German second division DEL2. He was presented with DEL2 Coach of the Year honors in the 2016–17 season.

Career statistics

Regular season and playoffs

International

References

External links 

1963 births
Living people
Espoo Blues players
Finnish ice hockey coaches
Finnish ice hockey right wingers
Ice hockey players at the 1992 Winter Olympics
Jokerit players
Leksands IF players
Lukko players
Moncton Hawks players
Montreal Canadiens draft picks
Olympic ice hockey players of Finland
Oulun Kärpät players
People from Ii
Winnipeg Jets (1979–1996) draft picks
Winnipeg Jets (1979–1996) players
Sportspeople from North Ostrobothnia